Body Language is a 2017 Nigerian thriller film. It was produced by Emem Isong who owns Rok Studios. Tom Robson is the cinematographer and the screenplay is by Kehinde Joseph.

Synopsis
Tola (Tana Adelana) works as a stripper as well as a marketer because she is interested in getting attention from men. One man, Nick (Ramsey Nouah), pays her to privately dance for him. Tola's life is in danger as a group of hired killers, "The Lagos reapers", is pursuing her. Nick's interest in Tola is not a coincidence as Nick is trying to investigate the killers, who murdered his daughter.

Cast 
The film starred: 
Ramsey Nouah as Nick 
Tana Adelana as Tola 
Lawretta Richards
Emem Ufot
Ken Erics as Lancelot

Reception
According to Talk African Movies, Body Language had a good plot and was mostly captivating, but was hindered by kinks that reduced its impact.

According to Jerry Chiemeke, despite some plot holes that were impossible to ignore, the film was "one of the better movies to have made it to cinemas this year."

The movie has been criticized for its lack of suspense.

See also 
 List of Nigerian films of 2017

References 

English-language Nigerian films
2017 romantic drama films
2010s romantic thriller films
Nigerian romantic drama films
Nigerian romantic thriller films
2010s English-language films
Films shot in Nigeria